The Pixel 7 and Pixel 7 Pro are a pair of Android smartphones designed, developed, and marketed by Google as part of the Google Pixel product line. They serve as the successor to the Pixel 6 and Pixel 6 Pro, respectively. The phones were first previewed in May 2022, during the Google I/O keynote. They are powered by the second-generation Google Tensor chip, and feature a design similar to that of the Pixel 6 series. They shipped with Android 13.

The Pixel 7 and Pixel 7 Pro were officially announced on October 6, 2022, at the annual Made by Google event, and were released in the United States on October 13.

History 
The Pixel 7 and Pixel 7 Pro were previewed by Google on May 11, 2022, during the 2022 Google I/O keynote. During the keynote, the company confirmed that the phones would feature the second-generation Google Tensor system-on-chip (SoC), which had been in development by October 2021. The phones were approved by the Federal Communications Commission (FCC) in August 2022. Google officially announced the phones on October 6, 2022, alongside the Pixel Watch smartwatch, at the annual Made by Google event, and became available in 17 countries on October 13. A portion of the phones were manufactured by Foxconn in Vietnam, shifting production from southern China. Google requested approximately eight million Pixel 7 units from suppliers, with the goal of increasing its sales numbers twofold. During the launch event, Google also announced the phones' official cases, which became available for pre-order on the same day with three color options for each phone. Pre-orders for the phones began on the same day as the announcement.

Specifications

Design 
The Pixel 7 and Pixel 7 Pro both feature the two-tone back color scheme and large camera bar introduced in the Pixel 6 and Pixel 6 Pro, with the camera bar now made of aluminum. The front of the phones also retain the Pixel 6 series' centered hole-punch display notch. They are each available in three colors:

Hardware 
The Pixel 7 has a  FHD+ 1080p OLED display at 416 ppi with a  pixel resolution and a 20:9 aspect ratio, while the Pixel 7 Pro has a  QHD+ 1440p LTPO OLED display at 512 ppi with a  pixel resolution and a 19.5:9 aspect ratio. The Pixel 7 has a 90 Hz refresh rate while the Pixel 7 Pro has a 120 Hz variable refresh rate. Both phones contain a 50 megapixel wide rear camera and a 12 megapixel ultrawide rear camera, with the Pixel 7 Pro featuring an additional 48 megapixel telephoto rear camera. The front camera on both phones contain a 10.8 megapixel ultrawide lens. The phones bring back the Pixel 4 and Pixel 4 XL's Face Unlock facial recognition system, except the feature is now solely powered by the front camera rather than Project Soli radar technology.

The Pixel 7 has a 4355 mAh battery, while the Pixel 7 Pro has a 5000 mAh battery. Both phones support fast charging, Qi wireless charging, as well as reverse wireless charging. The Pixel 7 is available in 128 or 256 GB of storage and 8 GB of RAM, and the Pixel 7 Pro is available in 128, 256, or 512 GB of storage and 12 GB of RAM. In addition to the second-generation Tensor chip, both phones are also equipped with the Titan M2 security module, along with an under-display optical fingerprint scanner, stereo speakers, and Gorilla Glass Victus. Counterpoint Research calculated that the Pixel 7 Pro cost an estimated  to manufacture.

Software 
The Pixel 7 and Pixel 7 Pro shipped with Android 13 and version 8.7 of the Google Camera app at launch. It will receive at least three years of major OS upgrades with support extending to 2025, and at least five years of security updates with support extending to 2027. In addition to enhancements to Night Sight and Real Tone, camera features introduced on the Pixel 7 and Pixel 7 Pro include Guided Frame, Photo Unblur, and Cinematic Blur. A macro photography mode is also available on the Pixel 7 Pro to accompany its additional telephoto lens, as are upgrades to Super Res Zoom. The Direct My Call feature and Recorder app both received performance upgrades, while Google announced that its VPN service from Google One would be bundled with the Pixel 7 series at no additional charge. The Pixel 7 and Pixel 7 Pro only run apps that have 64-bit binaries, the first Android smartphones with such a restriction. As part of a partnership with Google, Snapchat and TikTok announced support for 10-bit HDR video on the Pixel 7 series.

Marketing 
Similar to the previous year, Pixel 7-themed potato chips were made available in Japan weeks prior to the phones' launch event. In October 2022, Google partnered with the NBA to produce a series of advertisements for the Pixel lineup featuring multiple NBA athletes. In February 2023, Google released a commercial titled "Fixed on Pixel" which advertised the Pixel 7's Magic Eraser feature, ahead of its airing during Super Bowl LVII. Featuring Amy Schumer, Doja Cat, and Giannis Antetokounmpo, the 90-second commercial marked Google's second Super Bowl spot in a row which highlighted the Pixel line. The song "We Run This" by Missy Elliot is used in the commercial. "Fixed on Pixel" was positively received by viewers, with Northwestern University's Kellogg School of Management placing it among the highest-ranked spots of Super Bowl LVII. People and Teen Vogue both named it as one of the best commercials of the event, while CBS Sports ranked it as second-best and Tom's Guide labeled it as the best. It was the fifth most-watched Super Bowl LVII commercial on YouTube, and was ranked 12th on USA Today Super Bowl Ad Meter, scoring 5.81 points on a scale of 10.

Reception

Critical response 
Following the Pixel 7 and Pixel 7 Pro's reveal at the 2022 Google I/O, Sean Hollister of The Verge praised Google's development of a distinctive Pixel design language with the continuation of the Pixel 6 and Pixel 6a's camera bar. Both phones were well received after their launch. Julian Chokkattu of Wired and Max Buondonno of CNN Underscored lauded the phones' competitive pricing, displays, and camera capabilities. Dave LeClair of PCMag commended the Pixel 7's price and performance, while praising the Pixel 7 Pro's display and photography-related features. Gizmodo Florence Ion acclaimed the phones' camera system, and Marques Brownlee highlighted their software features. Mark Knapp and Kevin Lee of IGN viewed the phones as marginally superior to the Pixel 6 series, but praised Google's refinements nonetheless. The Verge Allison Johnson concurred, but found some of the new AI features "underwhelming". Lisa Eadicicco and Andrew Lanxon of CNET hailed the phones' incremental improvements as a reflection of Google's successful product formula, praising their design and features but criticizing the battery life. Engadget reviewer Sam Rutherford had a more positive experience with battery life, also praising the phones' upgraded designs. Mashable Alex Perry eulogized the larger phone's camera, but had reservations about the smaller Pixel 7 and lamented the loss of the Pixel 6 series' two-toned back design. Writing for TechRadar, Alex Walker-Todd applauded the Pixel 7's design and camera, while his colleague Philip Berne had mixed feelings about the Pixel 7 Pro's software features.

Commercial reception 
During Google parent company Alphabet's quarterly earnings investor call in February 2023, Google and Alphabet CEO Sundar Pichai touted the Pixel 6a, 7, and 7 Pro as Google's "best-selling generation of phones", allowing Google to gain market share in all of its markets. Additionally, a survey conducted by market research firm Wave7 in January 2023 further indicated that the Pixel 7 series, especially the Pro model, experienced stronger numbers than the Pixel 6 series.

References

Further reading

External links 
 Pixel 7
 Pixel 7 Pro
 Made by Google 2022

Android (operating system) devices
Flagship smartphones
Foxconn
Google hardware
Google Pixel
Mobile phones introduced in 2022
Mobile phones with 4K video recording
Mobile phones with multiple rear cameras